Alcatel OT 501 (or One Touch 501) is a mobile phone, with dual band, featuring a WAP browser (but not GPRS). It can handle a Li-Pol battery, has voice control, and monochromatic display (up to 8 lines), service menu (000000* to activate) and built-in handsfree. It has battery life of up to 7 days, if turned off during the night.  The specifications state it has 320 hours standby time and 5 hours talk time.
The OT 500 and OT 502 are very similar models.  The One Touch 501 was released in December 1999 and is no longer sold by Alcatel.

References

 
 Tricks for Alcatel 501
 Service menu in Alcatel 501
 Softpedia's review

OT 501
Alcatel mobile phones
Mobile phones introduced in 1999